Rubus superbus is an uncommon Guatemalan species of brambles in the rose family.

Rubus superbus is a perennial with wool and a few prickles but not many. Leaves are compound with three leaflets.

References

superbus
Flora of Guatemala
Plants described in 1893